Lei Jingtian (1904–1959) was a Chinese military personnel, a communist leader, and  President of the East China University of Political Science and Law.

Early life 
In 1904, Lei was born in Nanning, Guangxi, China.

Education 
In 1919, Lei participated in the May 4 Movement. In 1923 he enrolled in Xiamen University before transferring to the Great China University in Shanghai in 1924. In 1925 he was introduced by Yun Daiying into joining the Communist Party of China and participated in the May 30 Movement that year.

Career 
In 1926, after receiving a position at the Whampoa Military Academy, Lei participated in the Northern Expedition as a member of the National Revolutionary Army's 6th Army. 

Lei participated in the Nanchang Uprising of August 1, 1927 and the Guangzhou Uprising in December 1927. In 1929 he became the chairman of the communist base at Youjiang District, Baise, Guangxi. In 1931, at the end of his term, Lei left the communist party. In 1934 Lei joined the Long March. 

In 1935, Lei was re-inducted into the communist party at Yan'an, Shaanxi Province. Lei later participated in the Battle of Jinan in Shandong Province and Huaihai Campaign.

Personal life 
In 1959, Lei died in Shanghai, China.

References 

1904 births
1959 deaths
Chinese communists
Xiamen University alumni
People from Nanning
Presidents of East China University of Political Science and Law